Richard Hammond's Crash Course is an original series made for BBC America, presented by Top Gear presenter Richard Hammond. The show's first season premiered on April 16, 2012. Each episode of Season 1 follows Hammond as he is given three days to learn how to operate various pieces of heavy equipment across the United States. In Season 2, Hammond must now learn how to perform several odd jobs. A trailer for the series was posted on BBC America's official website on March 19, 2012. The series' first season began airing on BBC2 in the United Kingdom on September 2, 2012.

Background
The first episode of Crash Course aired on April 16, 2012, on BBC America, following the premiere of season 18 of Top Gear. The show's first episode features Hammond learning how to operate an American Army M1A2 Abrams tank at Fort Bliss. A total of six episodes were filmed. A trailer for the show's second season was released on September 25, 2012. The second season premiered on October 22, 2012. Writing for MotorAuthority.com, Nelson Ireson described the series as being like "Dirty Jobs but centered around vehicles". Ireson also commented that the BBC appears to be capitalizing on Hammond's "notoriety" as a Top Gear presenter due to the show being the top "unscripted" show on BBC America.

Episodes

Series overview

Season 1 (2012)

Season 2 (2012)

International broadcast
The first series began airing in the United Kingdom on BBC Two on Sunday, September 2, 2012 at 19:15 BST, followed by a repeat showing of the second episode from series 18 of Top Gear. Episodes two and three followed on September 9 and 16, again at 19:15 on Sundays, respectively. After poor viewing figures for the Sunday night broadcast, episodes four, five and six were moved to an early morning slot on Tuesday mornings, at 00:50 GMT. The series will be broadcast in Africa from September 30, 2012, on BBC Knowledge, on DStv. In Poland, the first series began airing on August 16, 2012 on BBC Knowledge, exactly four months after the original premiere.

References

General references

External links
 

2012 American television series debuts
BBC America original programming
English-language television shows
British reality television series
2010s American reality television series